Palala is a town in Bong County, Liberia.

Populated places in Liberia
Bong County